Rick Avery is an American stuntman, stunt coordinator, actor, director and author. He has worked on more than 400 films and television projects, including The Crow, The Prestige, The Dark Knight Rises, Gangster Squad, and American Sniper. He is also notable for having doubled for Robert De Niro, Dustin Hoffman, Richard Gere and John Travolta.

Rick is the author of his memoir, A Life at Risk.

Life and career

Rick was a Sergeant in the U.S. Army, and a Santa Barbara Metro Police Officer. He has three children; Dianne, Brian, and Mike, his sons also work as stunt performers. He is also a four-time master's world boxing champion.

Rick's directorial credits include The Expert and Deadly Outbreak. His acting credits include Heat, Edge of Darkness, Ant-Man and Hands of Stone.

Awards and nominations

References

External links
 
 

Living people
American stunt performers
American film directors
American male writers
American male film actors
Year of birth missing (living people)